[[File:Hart_aber_fair_-_2017-12-11-5669.jpg|thumb|140px|Roland Tichy at German television Hart aber Fair]]
Roland Tichy (born 11 November 1955 in Bad Reichenhall) is a German author, economist and journalist.

 Life 
Tichy studied economics and communication science in Munich and in New Orleans. After university he was hired as an assistant at Ludwig Maximilian University of Munich. From 1983 to 1985, he worked at the German Chancellery for Helmut Kohl. In the 1990s, Tichy joined the German company Daimler-Benz in the department of corporate issues management. 

Tichy was editor-in-chief of the German magazines Impulse (1991–1995), Euro (2002–2007) and Wirtschaftswoche (2007–2014). In 2014 he became the CEO of the Ludwig Erhard Foundation and, since 2016, he has been the publisher of the monthly magazine Tichys Einblick''. Tichy is a member of the neoliberal Mont Pelerin Society. He is married to Andrea Tichy.

Controversys 
In the spring of 2017, Tichy took part in a campaign initiated by the Alternative for Germany (AfD) to denigrate the former bishop Margot Käßmann as a "racist". A quote from Käßmann, which was falsified by omissions, was used for this purpose.

Publications

Awards 
 2008: Ludwig Erhardt Award by Ludwig Erhard Foundation
 2015: Hayek Medal by Friedrich Hayek Society

References

External links 

 Official Websity by Tichy: Tichys Einblick (Tichys Blog)
 Roman Pletter: Der Bauchredner, Die Zeit, 16 February 2017
 Focus.de: Der Terror in Paris und die Folgen, January 8, 2015

21st-century German journalists
People from Bad Reichenhall
German business and financial journalists
20th-century German male writers
1955 births
Mercedes-Benz Group people
20th-century German journalists
21st-century German  economists
20th-century German  economists
21st-century German male writers
German magazine editors
Writers from Bavaria
Living people
Wirtschaftswoche editors
Member of the Mont Pelerin Society